Cibolacris samalayucae, the samalayuca dune grasshopper, is a species of slant-faced grasshopper in the family Acrididae. It is found in Central America, North America, and Mexico.

References

Further reading

 
 Short-Horned Grasshoppers species in North America on Missouri Department Of Conservation

Acrididae
Articles created by Qbugbot
Insects described in 1961